Tetsu Yano (Japanese 矢野徹 Yano Tetsu; October 5, 1923 – October 13, 2004) was a Japanese science fiction translator and writer.  He began to introduce to Japanese readers the works of US science fiction writers in the late 1940s.  He was the first Japanese writer of the genre to visit the United States, in 1953.  He took part in founding Science Fiction and Fantasy Writers of Japan (SFWJ, 日本SF作家クラブ) in 1963, and served as its president from 1978 to 1979.

Yano was born in Matsuyama, Ehime Prefecture and grew up in Kobe. After studying at Chuo University for three years, he was drafted into the Imperial Japanese Army, serving two years and two months.  After the war he made a living collecting trash on a US military base, where he became fascinated with the colorfully illustrated science fiction works thrown away by the soldiers.

He learned to read English and eventually began translating science fiction. The works of Robert A. Heinlein, Frederik Pohl, Desmond Bagley, and Frank Herbert were among the some 360 translations by him. He also wrote stories of his own, including The Legend of the Paper Spaceship, which first appeared in English translation in 1984 and has appeared in several collections. Some of his stories have been adapted into anime.

Yano died on October 13, 2004, from cancer of the large intestine. Although he made a partial recovery after an operation in November of the previous year, he relapsed. His funeral was held on October 16, 2004.

See also
The Dagger of Kamui

External links
 Official SFWJ profile
 Internet Book List profile
 SFWA obituary
Entry in The Encyclopedia of Science Fiction

Japanese science fiction writers
Japanese male short story writers
Japanese speculative fiction critics
Japanese speculative fiction translators
1923 births
2004 deaths
People from Matsuyama, Ehime
Deaths from colorectal cancer
Chuo University alumni
20th-century translators
Imperial Japanese Army personnel of World War II
Deaths from cancer in Japan